The 2007–08 Maltese FA Trophy (known as U*BET FA Trophy for sponsorship reasons) was the 70th season since its establishment. It featured 20 teams from Maltese Premier League and First Division. The competition started on 3 November 2007 and ended on 24 May 2008 with the final, which Birkirkara F.C. won 2–1 against Hamrun Spartans.

Hibernians were the defending champions, but were eliminated in the quarterfinals by Valletta.

Calendar

Results
When the draw was conducted four teams received a bye to the Quarterfinals. Hibernians received a bye because they won the 2006–07 Maltese FA Trophy. Other three teams who received a bye directly to the Quarterfinals were Birkirkara, Marsaxlokk and Sliema Wanderers, for being three best-placed teams in previous year's Premier League.

First round
In the first round entered Premier League teams placed 4th to 10th and 10 First Division teams. The matches were played on 3, 4, 10 and 11 November 2007.

|colspan="3" style="background:#fcc;"|3 November 2007

|-
|colspan="3" style="background:#fcc;"|4 November 2007

|-
|colspan="3" style="background:#fcc;"|10 November 2007

|-
|colspan="3" style="background:#fcc;"|11 November 2007

|}

Second round
In this round entered winners from the previous round. The matches were played on 1 and 2 March 2008

|colspan="3" style="background:#fcc;"|1 March 2008

|-
|colspan="3" style="background:#fcc;"|2 March 2008

|}

Quarter-finals
In this round entered the winners from the previous round and the four teams that had received a bye. The matches were played on 12 and 13 April 2008.

Dingli Swallows was the only team from the First Division. They played against Hamrun Spartans and lost 3-1. The other three ties were all contested between Premier League teams. They all finished 2-1 in favour of Valletta, Floriana and Birkirkara who beat Hibernians, Sliema Wanderers and Marsaxlokk respectively. Hibernians were the defending champions.

Semi-finals
The winners from the Quarterfinals entered the Semifinals. The matches were played on 19 and 20 May 2008.

Both semifinals finished 4-2 in favour of Hamrun Spartans, who beat Floriana, and Birkirkara, who beat Valletta.

Final
The final was played on 24 May and was contested between Birkirkara and Hamrun Spartans. Michael Galea opened the scoring for Birkirkara but Hamrun Spartans levelled matters through Ryan Fenech but Michael Galea scored his 2nd to give Birkirkara the trophy.

Top scorers

External links
 Official site

Malta
Maltese FA Trophy seasons
Cup